Listed below are English sportsmen and sportswomen of note and some notable individuals born in England.

 
 
 

 Barney Aaron (Young) (1800–1850), lightweight boxer, Hall of Fame
 Harold Abrahams (1899–1978), athlete, Olympic champion (100-metre sprint) and silver (4x100-m relay), one of the two subjects of Chariots of Fire
 Sir Sidney Abrahams (1885–1957), Olympic long jumper
 Chris Adams (1955–2001), pro wrestler and judoka
 Neil Adams (born 1958), judoka and two-time silver medalist in Judo (1980 and 1984), younger brother of Chris Adams
 Nicola Adams (born 1982), two-time Olympic gold medallist and former world champion boxer
 Tony Adams (born 1966), footballer
 Edward Allen, footballer
 Malcolm Allison (1927–2010), football manager
 Simon Andrews (1984–2014), Isle of Man TT rider
 Jo Ankier (born 1982), Britain, record holder (1,500-m & 3,000-m steeplechase)
 Willie Applegarth (1890–1958), track and field athlete
 James Arnott, footballer
 Dina Asher-Smith (born 1995), fastest British woman; world champion (200m Doha 2019)
 Graham Atkinson (1943–2017), footballer
 Joe Baker (1940–2003), footballer and manager
 George Baldry (1911–1987), footballer
 Alan Ball (1945–2007), member of the 1966 World Cup winning team
 Billy Balmer (1875–1961), footballer
 Gordon Banks (1937–2019), goalkeeper of 1966 World Cup winning team
 Sir Roger Bannister (1929–2018), first sub-four-minute miler
 Robert Barker (1847–1915), footballer
 Donny Barnard (born 1984), footballer
 Wade Barrett (born 1980), WWE wrestler
 Cliff Bastin (1912–1991), footballer
 Arthur Bate (1908–1993), footballer
 Lord Frederick Beauclerk (1773–1850), cricket player and administrator
 David Beckham (born 1975), footballer
 Charles Bennett (1870–1948) track and field athlete
 Lawson Bennett (1938–2011), footballer
 Jack Kid Berg (Judah Bergman) (1909–1991), world champion junior welterweight boxer, Hall of Fame
 Richard Bergmann (1919–1970), 7-time table tennis world champion, ITTFHoF
 Billy Betts (1864–1941), footballer
 Ted Birnie (1878–1935), footballer and manager
 Sid Bishop (1900–1949), footballer
 Nick Blackman (born 1989), English-Israeli footballer
 Andrulla Blanchette (born 1966), IFBB professional bodybuilder
 Steve Bloomer (1874–1938), footballer and manager
 Chris Bonington (born 1934), mountaineer
 Bernard Bosanquet (1877–1936), cricketer
 Sir Ian Botham (born 1955), cricketer
 Mark Bott, cricketer
 Teddy Bourne (born 1948), Olympic épée fencer
 Geoffrey Boycott (born 1940), cricketer
 James Brae, footballer
 Eric Bristow (1957–2018), world champion darts player
 Johnny Brooks (1931–2016), footballer and manager
 Tony Brooks (born 1932), F1 driver
 Steve Bruce (born 1960), footballer & manager
 Bobby Buckle (1869–1959), footballer
 Chris Buckley (1886–1973), footballer
 Frank Buckley (1882–1964), footballer and manager
 Paul Burchill (born 1979), professional wrestler
 Cam Burgess (1919–1978), footballer
 Joe Butler (1879–1941), football player
 Jenson Button (born 1980), 2009 Formula One World Champion
 Angela Buxton (1934–2020), won 1956 French Women's Doubles (with Althea Gibson) and 1956 Wimbledon Women's Doubles (with Gibson), highest world ranking #9
 Peter Broadbent (1933–2013), footballer
 Michael Carrick (1981), footballer
 Herbert Chapman (1878–1934), football player and manager
 Sir Bobby Charlton (born 1937), member of the 1966 World Cup winning team
 Jack Charlton (1935–2020), member of the 1966 World Cup winning team
 Dave Charnley (1935–2012), lightweight boxer
 Charles Chenery (1850–1928), footballer and cricketer
 Sir Francis Chichester (1901–1972), yachtsman
 Ian Clough (1937–1970), mountaineer
 Don Cockell (1928–1983), heavyweight boxer
 Samuel Coe (1873–1955), first-class cricketer
 Chris Cohen (born 1987), footballer
 George Cohen (born 1939), association football right back, World Cup champion
 Andy Cole (born 1971), footballer
 Paul Collingwood (born 1976), cricketer
 Peter Collins (1931–1958), F1 driver
 Sir Henry Cooper (1934–2011), heavyweight boxer
 Ralph Cooperman (1927–2009), Olympic foil and sabre fencer
 Steve Coppell (born 1955), footballer & manager
 Lisa Cross (born 1978), IFBB professional bodybuilder
 Sid Crowl (1888–1971), footballer
 Russell Cuddihey (born 1939), footballer
 Stan Cullis (1916–2001), footballer and manager
 Laurie Cunningham (1956–1989), footballer
 Tom Daley (born 1994), youngest diver ever to compete in Olympics (participated in Beijing 2008)
 Lawrence Dallaglio (born 1972), World Cup winning rugby footballer
 Alan Davies (1933–2009), World Cup winning rugby footballer
 Laura Davies (born 1963), golfer
 Steve Davis (born 1957), six-time World Snooker Champion
 Matt Dawson (born 1972), World Cup winning rugby footballer
 John Deacon (1962–2001), motorcycle endurance racer
 Christopher Dean (born 1958), figure skater
 John Derbyshire (1878–1938), swimmer
 Graham Dilley (1959–2011), cricketer
 Percy Down (1883–1954), rugby union player, represented England and Great Britain
 Ted Drake (1912–1995), footballer and manager, cricketer for Hampshire County Cricket Club
 Fred Driver, footballer
 Harry Duckworth, footballer
 Jimmy Dugdale (1932–2008), footballer
 Duncan Edwards (1936–1958), footballer
 Jonathan Edwards (born 1966), triple jump
 Joe Egan (1919–2012), rugby footballer
 Godfrey Evans (1920–1999), cricketer (wicket-keeper)
 Ray Evans (1933–2009), footballer
 Fred Ewer (1898–1971), footballer
 James Fairburn, footballer
 Percy Fender, cricketer
 James Figg (before 1700–1734), prizefighter
 Sir Tom Finney (1922–2014) footballer
 Albert Firth (1937–2015), rugby footballer
 William Fiske (1885–1918), footballer
 Bob Fitzsimmons (1863–1917), boxing's first world champion in three divisions
 Andrew Flintoff (born 1977), cricketer
 Septimus Francom (1882–1965), long-distance runner
 C B Fry (1872–1956), cricketer and all-round athlete
 Tyson Fury (born 1988), professional boxer
 Ron Garland (1931–1989), footballer
 Paul Gascoigne (born 1967), football player
 Les Gaunt (1918–1985), footballer
 Dwight Gayle (born 1989), football player
 Steven Gerrard (born 1980), football player
 Graham Gooch (born 1953), cricketer                 
 Pete Goss (born 1961), around-the-world yachtsman                                                      
 Grantley Goulding (1874–1947), athlete
 W G Grace (1848–1915), cricketer
 Cyril Grant (1920–2002), footballer
 Jimmy Greaves (born 1940), footballer
 Jack Greenwell (1884–1942), footballer and manager
 Ron Greenwood (1921–2006), footballer and manager
 Will Greenwood (born 1972), rugby footballer  
 Ernest Hackett (1908–?), footballer
 Sam Haden (1902–1974), footballer and manager
 Naseem Hamed (born 1974), featherweight boxer
 Lewis Hamilton (born 1985), seven-time Formula One World Champion
 Harry Hampton (1885–1963), football player
 Ellis Hargreaves, footballer
 Ricky Hatton (born 1978), world champion boxer
 Mike Hawthorn (1929–1959), F1 World Champion
 David Haye (born 1980), world champion boxer
 Johnny Haynes (1934–2005), footballer
 Arthur Henfrey (1867–1929), footballer
 Emile Heskey (born 1978), footballer
 Charlie Hewitt (1884–1966), footballer and manager
 Damon Hill (born 1960), F1 World Champion
 Graham Hill (1929–1975), two times F1 World Champion
 Jimmy Hill (1928–2015), footballer
 Syd Hoar (1895–1967), footballer
 David Hobbs (born 1939), Former Formula One driver
 Jack Hobbs (1882–1963), cricketer
 Glenn Hoddle (born 1957), footballer
 Martin Hodgson (1909–1991), rugby footballer
 Teddy Hodgson (1885–1919), footballer
 Ken Holliday (1925–1999), footballer
 Duncan Horton (born 1967), footballer
 Leslie Housden (1894–1963), Olympic marathon runner
 William Howarth (1875–?), footballer
 John Howell (born 1936), Olympic long jumper
 Alexander Hughes (1907–1977), footballer
 Kenneth Hunt (1884–1949), footballer
 James Hunt (1947–1993), F1 World Champion
 Norman Hunter (1943–2020), footballer and manager
 Sir Geoff Hurst (born 1941), member of the 1966 World Cup winning team
 Nasser Hussain (born 1968), cricketer
 Len Hutton (1916–1990), cricketer 
 Gus Huxford (1889–1961), footballer
 Anthony Joshua (born 1989), professional boxer 
 David Jack (1898–1958), footballer and manager
 E.J. 'John' Jackett, rugby union player, represented England and Great Britain.
 Peter Jacobs (born 1938), Olympic fencer
 Peter Jaffe, Olympic silver (yachting; star-class)
 Allan Jay (born 1931), épée & foil fencer, Olympic two-time silver, world champion
 Richard Jerome (born 1968), cricketer
 Martin Johnson (born 1970), World Cup winning rugby union footballer
 Trish Johnson (born 1966), golfer
 Brian Keeble (1938–2015), footballer
 Mike Keen (1940–2009), footballer
 Howard Kendall (1946–2015), footballer and manager of Everton F.C.
 Joe Kennedy (1925–1986), footballer
 Josh Kennet (born 1987), English-Israeli footballer
 Joseph Kenyon, footballer
 Amir Khan (born 1986), lightweight boxer
 Herbert Kingaby (1880–1934), footballer
 Joseph Kitchen (1890–1974), footballer
 Paul Klenerman (born 1963), Olympic sabre fencer
 Frank Lampard (born 1978), footballer
 Dougie Lampkin (born 1976), Motorcycle Trials World Champion
 Mark Lazarus (born 1938), footballer, right winger
 Jason Leonard (born 1968), World Cup winning rugby union footballer
 Edward Lawrence Levy (1851–1932), English world champion weightlifter
 Lennox Lewis (born 1965), world champion heavyweight boxer
 Ted "Kid" Lewis (Gershon Mendeloff) (1893–1970), world champion welterweight boxer, Hall of Fame
 Josh Lewsey (born 1976), rugby footballer
 Jim Leytham (1879–1916), rugby footballer
 Billy Lindsay (1872–1933), footballer
 Jimmy Lindsay (1880–1925), footballer
 Gary Lineker (born 1960), footballer
 Sam Little (born 1975), professional golfer
 Nat Lofthouse (1925–2011), footballer
 James Lomas (1879–1960), rugby footballer
 Robert Lowe, footballer
 Hyman Lurie (1918–1982), table tennis player
 Dar Lyon, cricketer
 Dame Ellen MacArthur (born 1976), sailor who holds the world record for the fastest solo circumnavigation of the globe
 Ernie Machin (1944–2012), footballer
 George Mallory (1886–1924), mountaineer
 Andy Mangan (born 1986), footballer
 Nigel Mansell (born 1953), racing driver, F1 and CART champion
 Terry Marsh (born 1958), world champion boxer
 Darren Matthews (born 1968), professional wrestler
 Stanley Matthews (1915–2000), footballer
 Thomas Matthews (1884–1969), cyclist
 Jock McAvoy (1908–1971), boxer
 Bill McGarry (1927–2005), footballer and manager
 Bertie Mee (1918–2001), footballer and manager
 Daniel Mendoza (1764–1836), world heavyweight champion boxer, Hall of Fame
 Sidney Merlin (1856–1952), sports shooter
 John Middleton (1910–1971), footballer
 Colin Milburn (1941–1990), cricketer
 Gordon Miller (born 1939), Olympic high jumper
 Alan Minter (1951–2020), world champion boxer
 Ivor Montagu (1904–1984), British national team and founder of the International Table Tennis Federation
 Stan Mortensen (1921–1991), footballer and manager
 Bobby Moore (1941–1993), captain of the 1966 World Cup winning team
 Stirling Moss (born 1929), F1 driver
 Andy Murray (born 1987), tennis player, current number 2 seed
 Alfred Mynn (1807–1861), cricketer
 Gary Neville (born 1975), footballer
 Phil Neville (born 1977), footballer
 Justin Newell (born 1980), footballer
 Alison Nicholas (born 1962), golfer
 Harry Nuttall (1897–1969), footballer
 William Oakley (1873–1934), footballer
 Ronnie O'Sullivan (born 1975), three time World Snooker Champion
 Michael Owen (born 1979), football player
 James Oyebola (1961–2007), heavyweight boxer
 Bob Paisley (1919–1996), 3-time European Cup winning manager with Liverpool F.C.
 Rachel Parish (born 1981), markswoman and fencer
 Michael Park (1966–2005), WRC co-driver
 John Parrott (born 1964), world snooker champion
 George Payne (1921–1987), footballer
 Cyril Peacock (1929–1992), racing cyclist
 Fred Perry (1909–1995), Wimbledon champion tennis player
 Martin Peters (1943–2019), member of the 1966 World Cup winning team
 Eddie Phillips (1911–1995), boxer
 Kevin Pietersen (born 1980), cricketer
 Jack Plant (1871–1950), footballer
 David Pleat (born 1945), footballer, manager, and sports commentator
 David Pratt (1896–1967), footballer and manager
 Daniel Prenn (1904–1991), tennis player, highest world ranking #6
 Stephanie Proud (born 1988), backstroke swimmer
 Darren Quinton (born 1986), footballer
 Samuel Rabin (1903–1991), Olympic bronze wrestler (freestyle middleweight)
 Paula Radcliffe (born 1973), distance runner
 Alf Ramsay (1920–1999), football player and manager
 John Raphael (1882–1917), cricket and rugby union
 Sir Steve Redgrave (born 1962), rower, winner of gold medal in five consecutive Olympics
 William Regal (born 1968), WWE wrestler and commentator
 Cyrille Regis (1958–2018), footballer
 Sir Gordon Richards (1904–1988), jockey, holder of several records
 Richard Riley, footballer
 Jack Robinson (1870–1931), footballer
 Sir Bobby Robson (1933–2009), football manager
 Wayne Rooney (born 1985), footballer, all-time leading goal scorer for the England National Football Team and Manchester United Football Club
 David Seaman (born 1963), footballer
 Archie Sexton (1908–1957), boxer
 Dave Sexton (1930–2012), footballer and manager
 Paul Scholes (born 1974), footballer
 Alan Shearer (born 1970), footballer, all-time leading goal scorer in the premiership
 Teddy Sheringham (born 1966), football player
 Kelly Simm (born 1995), artistic gymnast
 Davey Boy Smith (1962–2002), professional wrestler
 Joe Smith (1889–1971), footballer and manager
 Tom Smith (1876–1937), footballer
 Cyril Spiers (1902–1967), footballer and manager
 Dennis Stevens (1933–2012), footballer
 Nobby Stiles (born 1942), football World Cup winner
 Andrew Stoddart (1863–1915), rugby and cricket player
 Frederick Stokes (1850–1929), rugby footballer
 Dr. Lennard Stokes (1856–1933), rugby footballer
 Karen Stupples (born 1973), golfer
 Frank Swift (1913–1958), footballer
 Andrew Sznajder (born 1967), English-born Canadian tennis player 
 Laurie Taitt (1934–2006), Olympic sprint hurdler
 Graham Taylor (1944–2017), footballer and manager
 Peta Taylor (1912–1989), cricketer
 Phil Taylor (born 1960), multi world champion darts player
 John Terry (born 1980), footballer
 Albert Thompson (1885–1956), footballer
 Jayne Torvill (born 1957), figure skater
 William Townley (1866–1950), footballer and manager
 Frank Townsend (1925–1946), rugby footballer
 Jack Tresadern (1890–1959), footballer and manager
 Marcus Trescothick (born 1975), cricketer
 Fred Trueman (1931–2006), fast bowler
 Phil Tufnell (born 1966), cricketer
 Derek Turner (1932–2015), world cup winning rugby footballer
 Randolph Turpin (1928–1966), middleweight boxer
 George Tweedy (1913–1987), footballer
 Geoff Twentyman (1930–2004), footballer and manager
 Michael Vaughan (born 1974), cricketer
 Stan Vickers (1932–2013), athlete
 Virginia Wade (born 1945), tennis player
 Sir William Wavell Wakefield (1898–1983), rugby footballer and politician
 George Waller (1864–1937), footballer
 Wallis Walters (1878–1952), hurdler
 Frank Warren (born 1952), boxing promoter
 Matt Wells (1886–1953), lightweight champion of Great Britain and world champion welterweight
 Ruth Westbrook (1930–2016), cricketer
 Johnny Wheeler (1928–2019), footballer
 Dan Wheldon (1978–2011), 2005 and 2011 Indy 500 Winner, 2005 Indy Car Series Champion
 Jimmy White (born 1962), snooker player
 Edgar Whittaker, footballer
 Arthur Whittam, footballer
 Bradley Wiggins (born 1980), first British man to win the Tour de France
 Jonny Wilkinson (born 1979), world cup winning rugby footballer
 Joey Williams (1902–1978), footballer
 Charlie Wilson (1895–1971), footballer
 Justin Wilson (1978–2015), racing driver
 Vivian Woodward (1879–1954), footballer
 Billy Wright (1924–1994), footballer
 Vic Wright (1909–1964), footballer

References

See also
List of Cornish sportsmen and sportswomen
List of England women Test cricketers
List of England women Twenty20 International cricketers

Lists of English sportspeople